Don Pasquale is a 1962 Australian television play based on the opera Don Pasquale. Australian TV drama was relatively rare at the time.

Cast
 Peter Baillie as Ernest
 Alan Eddy as Don Pasquale
 John Germain as Dr. Malatesta
 Rosalind Keene as Norina

Reception
The Sydney Morning Herald critic thought the "acting was not of a calibre to seem more than dutifully amusing at close quarter" and that some of the cast struggled "to suit lip, tongue and jaw movements to the sound of their own pre-recorded voices" but that "the compensations were many and decisive: coolly handsome settings and costumes... a sequence of witty and graceful drawings of orchestral musicians that solved the problem of what to do with the cameras during the overture; a general visual sophistication and dignity" as well as the "insinuating brilliance of Donizetti's music".

References

External links
Don Pasquale at IMDb
Clip of Rosalind Keene and John Germain from film at YouTube
Clip of Rosalind Keene from production at YouTube

1960s Australian television plays
Australian television plays based on operas
Films directed by Alan Burke (director)